The 2015 Voronin Cup  took place on December 15-16 in Moscow, Russia.

Medal winners

Senior Result

All-Around

Vault

Uneven Bars

Balance Beam

Floor Exercise

Junior Result

All-Around

Vault

Uneven Bars

Balance Beam

Floor Exercise

References

Voronin Cup
2015 in gymnastics
2015 in Russian sport
Sports competitions in Moscow
2015 in Moscow
December 2015 sports events in Russia